José Estevão da Costa (born 18 August 1928), known just as José da Costa, is a former Portuguese footballer who played as a half-back.

Starting at  CUF Barreiro, Costa was fringe player at Benfica, where he won two titles. Elsewhere, he helped Vitória de Guimarães and Lusitano de Évora establish themselves in the Primeira Liga.

Career
Born in Lisbon, Costa started his career at CUF Barreiro, before joining Benfica in 1947. He made his debut on 9 May 1948, against Elvas, and scored his first goal, two weeks later, on 30 May, with Olhanense. His playing time was limited in 1948–49, as he only played once, on 10 October in a 6–0 win against Vitória de Setúbal. In the following year, he played sparingly but still helped Benfica win the league and the Latin Cup, playing all the games of the latter. Despite playing more games in 1950–51 and in 1951–52, he did not win any silverware, since he did play in any of Taça de Portugal campaign's that Benfica won. 

In 1952, he departs Benfica to play for Vitória de Guimarães, helping them to two consecutive eight place finishes in the league, but also being involved in the club first demotion in 1954–55. He kept on playing in the first tier, moving to Lusitano de Évora in 1955, being regularly used in two seasons there, which included a club best, fifth place in 1956–57.

Honours
Benfica
Primeira Divisão: 1949–50 
Latin Cup: 1949–50

References
General
 

Specific

External links

1928 births
Living people
Footballers from Lisbon
Portuguese footballers
Association football midfielders
Primeira Liga players
G.D. Fabril players
S.L. Benfica footballers
Vitória S.C. players
Lusitano G.C. players